Pelicans (genus Pelecanus) are a genus of large water birds that make up the family Pelecanidae. They are characterized by a long beak and a large throat pouch used for catching prey and draining water from the scooped-up contents before swallowing. They have predominantly pale plumage, except for the brown and Peruvian pelicans. The bills, pouches, and bare facial skin of all pelicans become brightly coloured before the breeding season. The eight living pelican species have a patchy global distribution, ranging latitudinally from the tropics to the temperate zone, though they are absent from interior South America and from polar regions and the open ocean.

Long thought to be related to frigatebirds, cormorants, tropicbirds, and gannets and boobies, pelicans instead are now known to be most closely related to the shoebill and hamerkop, and are placed in the order Pelecaniformes. Ibises, spoonbills, herons, and bitterns have been classified in the same order. Fossil evidence of pelicans dates back at least 36 million years to the remains of a tibiotarsus recovered from late Eocene strata of Egypt that bears striking similarity to modern species of pelican. They are thought to have evolved in the Old World and spread into the Americas; this is reflected in the relationships within the genus as the eight species divide into Old World and New World lineages. This hypothesis is supported by fossil evidence from the oldest pelican taxa.

Pelicans frequent inland and coastal waters, where they feed principally on fish, catching them at or near the water surface. They are gregarious birds, travelling in flocks, hunting cooperatively, and breeding colonially. Four white-plumaged species tend to nest on the ground, and four brown or grey-plumaged species nest mainly in trees. The relationship between pelicans and people has often been contentious. The birds have been persecuted because of their perceived competition with commercial and recreational fishing. Their populations have fallen through habitat destruction, disturbance, and environmental pollution, and three species are of conservation concern. They also have a long history of cultural significance in mythology, and in Christian and heraldic iconography.

Taxonomy and systematics

Etymology
The name comes from the Ancient Greek word pelekan (πελεκάν), which is itself derived from the word pelekys (πέλεκυς) meaning "axe". In classical times, the word was applied to both the pelican and the woodpecker.

The genus Pelecanus was first formally described by Carl Linnaeus in his landmark 1758 10th edition of Systema Naturae. He described the distinguishing characteristics as a straight bill hooked at the tip, linear nostrils, a bare face, and fully webbed feet. This early definition included frigatebirds, cormorants, and sulids, as well as pelicans.

Taxonomy

The family Pelecanidae was introduced (as Pelicanea) by the French polymath Constantine Samuel Rafinesque in 1815.
Pelicans give their name to the Pelecaniformes, an order which has a varied taxonomic history. Tropicbirds, darters, cormorants, gannets, boobies, and frigatebirds, all traditional members of the order, have since been reclassified: tropicbirds into their own order, Phaethontiformes, and the remainder into the Suliformes. In their place, herons, ibises, spoonbills, the hamerkop, and the shoebill have now been transferred into the Pelecaniformes. Molecular evidence suggests that the shoebill and the hamerkop form a sister group to the pelicans, though some doubt exists as to the exact relationships among the three lineages.

The oldest known record of Pelicans is a right tibiotarsus very similar to those of modern species from the Birket Qarun Formation in the Wadi El Hitan in Egypt, dating to the late Eocene (Priabonian), referred to the genus Eopelecanus.

Living species
The eight living pelican species were traditionally divided into two groups, one containing four ground-nesters with mainly white adult plumage (Australian, Dalmatian, great white, and American white pelicans), and one containing four grey- or brown-plumaged species which nest preferentially either in trees (pink-backed, spot-billed and brown pelicans), or on sea rocks (Peruvian pelican). The largely marine brown and Peruvian pelicans, formerly considered conspecific, are sometimes separated from the others by placement in the subgenus Leptopelecanus but in fact species with both sorts of appearance and nesting behavior are found in either.

DNA sequencing of both mitochondrial and nuclear genes yielded quite different relationships; the three New World pelicans formed one lineage, with the American white pelican sister to the two brown pelicans, and the five Old World species the other. The Dalmatian, pink-backed, and spot-billed were all closely related to one another, while the Australian white pelican was their next-closest relative. The great white pelican also belonged to this lineage, but was the first to diverge from the common ancestor of the other four species. This finding suggests that pelicans evolved in the Old World and spread into the Americas, and that preference for tree- or ground-nesting is more related to size than genetics.

Fossil record
The fossil record shows that the pelican lineage has existed for at least 36 million years; the oldest known pelican fossil was assigned to Eopelecanus aegyptiacus and was found in late Eocene (middle to late part of the early Priabonian stage/age) deposits of the Birket Qarun Formation within the Wadi Al-Hitan World Heritage Site in Egypt. A more complete fossil pelican of early Oligocene age is known from deposits at the Luberon in southeastern France, and is remarkably similar to modern forms. Its beak is almost complete and is morphologically identical to that of present-day pelicans, showing that this advanced feeding apparatus was already in existence at the time. An Early Miocene fossil has been named Miopelecanus gracilis on the basis of certain features originally considered unique, but later thought to lie within the range of interspecific variation in Pelecanus. The Late Eocene Protopelicanus may be a pelecaniform or suliform – or a similar aquatic bird such as a pseudotooth (Pelagornithidae), but is not generally considered a pelecanid. The supposed Miocene pelican Liptornis from Patagonia is a nomen dubium (of doubtful validity), being based on fragments providing insufficient evidence to support a valid description.

Fossil finds from North America have been meagre compared with Europe, which has a richer fossil record. Several Pelecanus species have been described from fossil material, including:
 Pelecanus cadimurka, Rich & van Tets, 1981 (Late Pliocene, South Australia)
 Pelecanus cautleyi, Davies, 1880 (Early Pliocene, Siwalik Hills, India)
 Pelecanus fraasi, Lydekker, 1891 (Middle Miocene, Bavaria, Germany)
 Pelecanus gracilis, Milne-Edwards, 1863 (Early Miocene, France) (see: Miopelecanus)
 Pelecanus halieus, Wetmore, 1933 (Late Pliocene, Idaho, US)
 Pelecanus intermedius, Fraas, 1870 (Middle Miocene, Bavaria, Germany) (transferred to Miopelecanus by Cheneval in 1984)
 Pelecanus odessanus, Widhalm, 1886 (Late Miocene, near Odessa, Ukraine)
 Pelecanus schreiberi, Olson, 1999 (Early Pliocene, North Carolina, US)
 Pelecanus sivalensis, Davies, 1880 (Early Pliocene, Siwalik Hills, India)
 Pelecanus tirarensis, Miller, 1966 (Late Oligocene to Middle Miocene, South Australia)

Description

Pelicans are very large birds with very long bills characterised by a downcurved hook at the end of the upper mandible, and the attachment of a huge gular pouch to the lower. The slender rami of the lower bill and the flexible tongue muscles form the pouch into a basket for catching fish, and sometimes rainwater, though to not hinder the swallowing of large fish, the tongue itself is tiny. They have a long neck and short stout legs with large, fully webbed feet. Although they are among the heaviest of flying birds, they are relatively light for their apparent bulk because of air pockets in the skeleton and beneath the skin, enabling them to float high in the water. The tail is short and square. The wings are long and broad, suitably shaped for soaring and gliding flight, and have the unusually large number of 30 to 35 secondary flight feathers.

Males are generally larger than females and have longer bills.

Pelicans have mainly light-coloured plumage, the exceptions being the brown and Peruvian pelicans. The bills, pouches, and bare facial skin of all species become brighter before breeding season commences. The throat pouch of the Californian subspecies of the brown pelican turns bright red, and fades to yellow after the eggs are laid, while the throat pouch of the Peruvian pelican turns blue. The American white pelican grows a prominent knob on its bill that is shed once females have laid eggs. The plumage of immature pelicans is darker than that of adults. Newly hatched chicks are naked and pink, darkening to grey or black after 4 to 14 days, then developing a covering of white or grey down.

Air sacs
Anatomical dissections of two brown pelicans in 1939 showed that pelicans have a network of air sacs under their skin situated across the ventral surface including the throat, breast, and undersides of the wings, as well as having air sacs in their bones. The air sacs are connected to the airways of the respiratory system, and the pelican can keep its air sacs inflated by closing its glottis, but how air sacs are inflated is not clear. The air sacs serve to keep the pelican remarkably buoyant in the water and may also cushion the impact of the pelican's body on the water surface when they dive from flight into water to catch fish. Superficial air sacs may also help to round body contours (especially over the abdomen, where surface protuberances may be caused by viscera changing size and position) to enable the overlying feathers to form more effective heat insulation and also to enable feathers to be held in position for good aerodynamics.

Distribution and habitat
Modern pelicans are found on all continents except Antarctica. They primarily inhabit warm regions, although breeding ranges extend to latitudes of 45° South (Australian pelicans in Tasmania) and 60° North (American white pelicans in western Canada). Birds of inland and coastal waters, they are absent from polar regions, the deep ocean, oceanic islands (except the Galapagos), and inland South America, as well as from the eastern coast of South America from the mouth of the Amazon River southwards. Subfossil bones have been recovered from as far south as New Zealand's South Island, although their scarcity and isolated occurrence suggests that these remains may have merely been vagrants from Australia (much as is the case today).

Behaviour and ecology

Pelicans swim well with their strong legs and their webbed feet. They rub the backs of their heads on their preen glands to pick up an oily secretion, which they transfer to their plumage to waterproof it. Holding their wings only loosely against their bodies, pelicans float with relatively little of their bodies below the water surface. They dissipate excess heat by gular flutter – rippling the skin of the throat and pouch with the bill open to promote evaporative cooling. They roost and loaf communally on beaches, sandbanks, and in shallow water.

A fibrous layer deep in the breast muscles can hold the wings rigidly horizontal for gliding and soaring. Pelicans also fly low (or "skim") over stretches of water, using a phenomenon known as ground effect to reduce drag and increase lift. As the air flows between the wings and the water surface, it is compressed to a higher density and exerts a stronger upward force against the bird above. Hence, substantial energy is saved while flying.

Adult pelicans rely on visual displays and behaviour to communicate, particularly using their wings and bills. Agonistic behaviour consists of thrusting and snapping at opponents with their bills, or lifting and waving their wings in a threatening manner. Adult pelicans grunt when at the colony, but are generally silent elsewhere or outside breeding season. Conversely, colonies are noisy, as chicks vocalise extensively.

Breeding and lifespan

Pelicans are gregarious and nest colonially. Pairs are monogamous for a single season, but the pair bond extends only to the nesting area; mates are independent away from the nest. The ground-nesting (white) species have a complex communal courtship involving a group of males chasing a single female in the air, on land, or in the water while pointing, gaping, and thrusting their bills at each other. They can finish the process in a day. The tree-nesting species have a simpler process in which perched males advertise for females. The location of the breeding colony is constrained by the availability of an ample supply of fish to eat, although pelicans can use thermals to soar and commute for hundreds of kilometres daily to fetch food.

The Australian pelican has two reproductive strategies depending on the local degree of environmental predictability. Colonies of tens or hundreds, rarely thousands, of birds breed regularly on small coastal and subcoastal islands where food is seasonally or permanently available. In arid inland Australia, especially in the endorheic Lake Eyre basin, pelicans breed opportunistically in very large numbers of up to 50,000 pairs, when irregular major floods, which may be many years apart, fill ephemeral salt lakes and provide large amounts of food for several months before drying out again.

In all species, copulation takes place at the nest site; it begins shortly after pairing and continues for 3–10 days before egg-laying. The male brings the nesting material, in ground-nesting species (which may not build a nest) sometimes in the pouch, and in tree-nesting species crosswise in the bill. The female then heaps the material up to form a simple structure.

The eggs are oval, white, and coarsely textured. All species normally lay at least two eggs; the usual clutch size is one to three, rarely up to six. Both sexes incubate with the eggs on top of or below the feet; they may display when changing shifts. Incubation takes 30–36 days; hatching success for undisturbed pairs can be as high as 95%, but because of sibling competition or siblicide, in the wild, usually all but one nestling dies within the first few weeks (later in the pink-backed and spot-billed species). Both parents feed their young. Small chicks are fed by regurgitation; after about a week, they are able to put their heads into their parents' pouches and feed themselves. Sometimes before, but especially after being fed the pelican chick may seem to "throw a tantrum" by loudly vocalizing and dragging itself around in a circle by one wing and leg, striking its head on the ground or anything nearby and the tantrums sometimes end in what looks like a seizure that results in the chick falling briefly unconscious; the reason is not clearly known, but a common belief is that it is to draw attention to itself and away from any siblings who are waiting to be fed.

Parents of ground-nesting species sometimes drag older young around roughly by the head before feeding them. From about 25 days old, the young of these species gather in "pods" or "crèches" of up to 100 birds in which parents recognise and feed only their own offspring. By 6–8 weeks they wander around, occasionally swimming, and may practise communal feeding. Young of all species fledge 10–12 weeks after hatching. They may remain with their parents afterwards, but are now seldom or never fed. They are mature at three or four years old. Overall breeding success is highly variable. Pelicans live for 15 to 25 years in the wild, although one reached an age of 54 years in captivity.

Feeding
The diet of pelicans usually consists of fish, but occasionally amphibians, turtles, crustaceans, insects, birds, and mammals are also eaten. The size of the preferred prey fish varies depending on pelican species and location. In deep water, white pelicans often fish alone. Nearer the shore, several encircle schools of small fish or form a line to drive them into the shallows, beating their wings on the water surface and then scooping up the prey. Although all pelican species may feed in groups or alone, the Dalmatian, pink-backed, and spot-billed pelicans are the only ones to prefer solitary feeding. When fishing in groups, all pelican species have been known to work together to catch their prey, and Dalmatian pelicans may even cooperate with great cormorants. 

Large fish are caught with the bill-tip, then tossed up in the air to be caught and slid into the gullet head-first. A gull will sometimes stand on the pelican's head, peck it to distraction, and grab a fish from the open bill. Pelicans in their turn sometimes snatch prey from other waterbirds.

The only other pelican to feed using a similar technique is the Peruvian pelican, but its dives are typically from a lower height than the brown pelican. The Australian and American white pelicans may feed by low plunge-dives landing feet-first and then scooping up the prey with the beak, but they—as well as the remaining pelican species—primarily feed while swimming on the water. Aquatic prey is most commonly taken at or near the water surface. Although principally a fish eater, the Australian pelican is also an eclectic and opportunistic scavenger and carnivore that forages in landfill sites, as well as taking carrion and "anything from insects and small crustaceans to ducks and small dogs". Food is not stored in a pelican's throat pouch, contrary to popular folklore.

Pelicans may also eat birds. In southern Africa, eggs and chicks of the Cape cormorant are an important food source for great white pelicans. Several other bird species have been recorded in the diet of this pelican in South Africa, including Cape gannet chicks on Malgas Island as well as crowned cormorants, kelp gulls, greater crested terns, and African penguins on Dassen Island and elsewhere. The Australian pelican, which is particularly willing to take a wide range of prey items, has been recorded feeding on young Australian white ibis, and young and adult grey teals and silver gulls. Brown pelicans have been reported preying on young common murres in California and the eggs and nestlings of cattle egrets and nestling great egrets in Baja California, Mexico. Peruvian pelicans in Chile have been recorded feeding on nestlings of imperial shags, juvenile Peruvian diving petrels, and grey gulls. Cannibalism of chicks of their own species is known from the Australian, brown, and Peruvian pelicans. Non-native great white pelicans have been observed swallowing city pigeons in St. James's Park in London, England.

Status and conservation

Populations
Globally, pelican populations are adversely affected by these main factors: declining supplies of fish through overfishing or water pollution, destruction of habitat, direct effects of human activity such as disturbance at nesting colonies, hunting and culling, entanglement in fishing lines and hooks, and the presence of pollutants such as DDT and endrin. Most species' populations are more or less stable, although three are classified by the IUCN as being at risk. All species breed readily in zoos, which is potentially useful for conservation management.

The combined population of brown and Peruvian pelicans is estimated at 650,000 birds, with around 250,000 in the United States and Caribbean, and 400,000 in Peru. The National Audubon Society estimates the global population of the brown pelican at 300,000. Numbers of brown pelican plummeted in the 1950s and 1960s, largely as a consequence of environmental DDT pollution, and the species was listed as endangered in the US in 1970. With restrictions on DDT use in the US from 1972, its population has recovered, and it was delisted in 2009.

The Peruvian pelican is listed as near threatened because, although the population is estimated by BirdLife International to exceed 500,000 mature individuals, and is possibly increasing, it has been much higher in the past. It declined dramatically during the 1998 El Niño event and could experience similar declines in the future. Conservation needs include regular monitoring throughout the range to determine population trends, particularly after El Niño years, restricting human access to important breeding colonies, and assessing interactions with fisheries.

The spot-billed pelican has an estimated population between 13,000 and 18,000 and is considered to be near threatened in the IUCN Red List of Threatened Species. Numbers declined substantially during the 20th century, one crucial factor being the eradication of the important Sittaung valley breeding colony in Burma through deforestation and the loss of feeding sites. The chief threats it faces are from habitat loss and human disturbance, but populations have mostly stabilised following increased protection in India and Cambodia.

The pink-backed pelican has a large population ranging over much of sub-Saharan Africa. In the absence of substantial threats or evidence of declines across its range, its conservation status is assessed as being of least concern. Regional threats include the drainage of wetlands and increasing disturbance in southern Africa. The species is susceptible to bioaccumulation of toxins and the destruction of nesting trees by logging.

The American white pelican has increased in numbers, with its population estimated at over 157,000 birds in 2005, becoming more numerous east of the continental divide, while declining in the west. However, whether its numbers have been affected by exposure to pesticides is unclear, as it has also lost habitat through wetland drainage and competition with recreational use of lakes and rivers.

Great white pelicans range over a large area of Africa and southern Asia. The overall trend in numbers is uncertain, with a mix of regional populations that are increasing, declining, stable, or unknown, but no evidence has been found of rapid overall decline, and the status of the species is assessed as being of least concern. Threats include the drainage of wetlands, persecution and sport hunting, disturbance at the breeding colonies, and contamination by pesticides and heavy metals.

The Dalmatian pelican has a population estimated at between 10,000 and 20,000 following massive declines in the 19th and 20th centuries. The main ongoing threats include hunting, especially in eastern Asia, disturbance, coastal development, collision with overhead power lines, and the over-exploitation of fish stocks. It is listed as near threatened by the IUCN Red List of Threatened Species as the population trend is downwards, especially in Mongolia, where it is nearly extinct. However, several European colonies are increasing in size and the largest colony for the species, at the Small Prespa Lake in Greece, has reached about 1,400 breeding pairs following conservation measures.

Widespread across Australia, the Australian pelican has a population generally estimated at between 300,000 and 500,000 individuals. Overall population numbers fluctuate widely and erratically depending on wetland conditions and breeding success across the continent. The species is assessed as being of least concern.

Culling and disturbance
Pelicans have been persecuted by humans for their perceived competition for fish, despite the fact that their diet overlaps little with fish caught by people. Starting in the 1880s, American white pelicans were clubbed and shot, their eggs and young were deliberately destroyed, and their feeding and nesting sites were degraded by water management schemes and wetland drainage. Even in the 21st century, an increase in the population of American white pelicans in southeastern Idaho in the US was seen to threaten the recreational cutthroat trout fishery there, leading to official attempts to reduce pelican numbers through systematic harassment and culling.

Great white pelicans on Dyer Island, in the Western Cape region of South Africa, were culled during the 19th century because their predation of the eggs and chicks of guano-producing seabirds was seen to threaten the livelihood of the guano collectors. More recently, such predation at South African seabird colonies has impacted on the conservation of threatened seabird populations, especially crowned cormorants, Cape cormorants, and bank cormorants. This has led to suggestions that pelican numbers should be controlled at vulnerable colonies.

Apart from habitat destruction and deliberate, targeted persecution, pelicans are vulnerable to disturbance at their breeding colonies by birdwatchers, photographers, and other curious visitors. Human presence alone can cause the birds to accidentally displace or destroy their eggs, leave hatchlings exposed to predators and adverse weather, or even abandon their colonies completely.

Poisoning and pollution

DDT pollution in the environment was a major cause of decline of brown pelican populations in North America in the 1950s and 1960s. It entered the oceanic food web, contaminating and accumulating in several species, including one of the pelican's primary food fish – the northern anchovy. Its metabolite DDE is a reproductive toxicant in pelicans and many other birds, causing eggshell thinning and weakening, and consequent breeding failure through the eggs being accidentally crushed by brooding birds. Since an effective ban on the use of DDT was implemented in the US in 1972, the eggshells of breeding brown pelicans there have thickened and their populations have largely recovered.

In the late 1960s, following the major decline in brown pelican numbers in Louisiana from DDT poisoning, 500 pelicans were imported from Florida to augment and re-establish the population; over 300 subsequently died in April and May 1975 from poisoning by the pesticide endrin. About 14,000 pelicans, including 7500 American white pelicans, perished from botulism after eating fish from the Salton Sea in 1990. In 1991, abnormal numbers of brown pelicans and Brandt's cormorants died at Santa Cruz, California, when their food fish (anchovies) were contaminated with neurotoxic domoic acid, produced by the diatom Pseudo-nitzschia.

As waterbirds that feed on fish, pelicans are highly susceptible to oil spills, both directly by being oiled and by the impact on their food resources. A 2007 report to the California Fish and Game Commission estimated that during the previous 20 years, some 500–1000 brown pelicans had been affected by oil spills in California. A 2011 report by the Center for Biological Diversity, a year after the April 2010 Deepwater Horizon oil spill, said that 932 brown pelicans had been collected after being affected by oiling and estimated that 10 times that number had been harmed as a result of the spill.

Where pelicans interact with fishers, through either sharing the same waters or scavenging for fishing refuse, they are especially vulnerable to being hooked and entangled in both active and discarded fishing lines. Fish hooks are swallowed or catch in the skin of the pouch or webbed feet, and strong monofilament fishing line can become wound around bill, wings, or legs, resulting in crippling, starvation, and often death. Local rescue organisations have been established in North America and Australia by volunteers to treat and rehabilitate injured pelicans and other wildlife.

Parasites and disease
As with other bird families, pelicans are susceptible to a variety of parasites. Avian malaria is carried by the mosquito Culex pipens, and high densities of these biting insects may force pelican colonies to be abandoned. Leeches may attach to the vent or sometimes the inside of the pouch. A study of the parasites of the American white pelican found 75 different species, including tapeworms, flukes, flies, fleas, ticks, and nematodes. 

The brown pelican has a similarly extensive range of parasites. The nematodes Contracaecum multipapillatum and C. mexicanum and the trematode Ribeiroia ondatrae have caused illness and mortality in the Puerto Rican population, possibly endangering the pelican on this island. 

Many pelican parasites are found in other bird groups, but several lice are very host-specific. Healthy pelicans can usually cope with their lice, but sick birds may carry hundreds of individuals, which hastens a sick bird's demise. The pouch louse Piagetiella peralis occurs in the pouch and so it cannot be removed by preening. While this is usually not a serious problem even when present in such numbers that it covers the whole interior of the pouch, sometimes inflammation and bleeding may occur from it and harm the host. 

In May 2012, hundreds of Peruvian pelicans were reported to have perished in Peru from a combination of starvation and roundworm infestation.

Religion, mythology, and popular culture

The pelican (henet in Egyptian) was associated in Ancient Egypt with death and the afterlife. It was depicted in art on the walls of tombs, and figured in funerary texts, as a protective symbol against snakes. Henet was also referred to in the Pyramid Texts as the "mother of the king" and thus seen as a goddess. References in nonroyal funerary papyri show that the pelican was believed to possess the ability to prophesy safe passage in the underworld for someone who had died.

Consumption of pelican, as with other seabirds, is considered not kosher as an unclean animal, and thus forbidden in Jewish dietary law.

An origin myth from the Murri people of Queensland, cited by Andrew Lang, describes how the Australian pelican acquired its black and white plumage. The pelican, formerly a black bird, made a canoe during a flood to save drowning people. He fell in love with a woman he thus saved, but her friends and she tricked him and escaped. The pelican consequently prepared to go to war against them by daubing himself with white clay as war paint. However, before he had finished, another pelican, on seeing such a strange piebald creature, killed him with its beak, and all such pelicans have been black and white ever since.

The Moche people of ancient Peru worshipped nature. They placed emphasis on animals and often depicted pelicans in their art.

Alcatraz Island was given its name by the Spanish because of the large numbers of brown pelicans nesting present. The word alcatraz is itself derived from the Arabic al-caduos, a term used for a water-carrying vessel and likened to the pouch of the pelican. The English name albatross is also derived by corruption of the Spanish word.

Christianity

The Physiologus, a didactic Christian text from the 3rd or 4th century, claims that pelicans kill their young when they grow and strike their parents in the face, but then the mother laments them for three days, after which she strikes her side and brings them back to life with her blood. This the Physiologus explains as mirroring the pain inflicted on God by people's idolatry, and the self-sacrifice of Jesus on the cross redeeming the sinful (see the blood and water gushing from the wound in his side). This text was widely copied, translated, and sometimes closely paraphrased during the Middle Ages, for instance by 13th-century authors Guillaume le Clerc and Bartholomaeus Anglicus. Likewise, a folktale from India says that a pelican killed her young by rough treatment, but was then so contrite that she resurrected them with her own blood. In a newer, also medieval version of the European myth, the pelican was thought to be particularly attentive to her young, to the point of providing them with blood by wounding her own breast when no other food was available. As a result, the pelican came to symbolise the Passion of Jesus and the Eucharist, supplementing the image of the lamb and the flag. A reference to this mythical characteristic is contained for example in the hymn by Saint Thomas Aquinas, "Adoro te devote" or "Humbly We Adore Thee", where in the penultimate verse, he describes Christ as the loving divine pelican, one drop of whose blood can save the world.

Elizabeth I of England adopted the symbol, portraying herself as the "mother of the Church of England". The Pelican Portrait of her was painted around 1573, probably by Nicholas Hilliard. A pelican feeding her young is depicted in an oval panel at the bottom of the title page of the first (1611) edition of the King James Bible. Such "a pelican in her piety" appears in the 1686 reredos by Grinling Gibbons in the church of St Mary Abchurch in the City of London. Earlier medieval examples of the motif appear in painted murals, for example that of circa 1350 in the parish church of Belchamp Walter, Essex.

The self-sacrificial aspect of the pelican was reinforced by the widely read medieval bestiaries. The device of "a pelican in her piety" or "a pelican vulning (from Latin vulnerō, "I wound, I injure, I hurt") herself" was used in religious iconography and heraldry.

Origin in nature
The legends of self-wounding and the provision of blood may have arisen because of the impression a pelican sometimes gives that it is stabbing itself with its bill. In reality, it often presses this onto its chest to fully empty the pouch. Another possible derivation is the tendency of the bird to rest with its bill on its breast; the Dalmatian pelican has a blood-red pouch in the early breeding season and this may have contributed to the myth.

Heraldry

Pelicans have featured extensively in heraldry, generally using the Christian symbolism of the pelican as a caring and self-sacrificing parent. Heraldic images featuring a "pelican vulning" refers to a pelican injuring herself, while a "pelican in her piety" refers to a female pelican feeding her young with her own blood. The King of Portugal John II adopted the pelican as is own personal sygil while he was Infante, evoking the christian symbology to equate the sacrifice of his blood to feed the nation. The pelican as a symbol also became sinonimous with the increasing charity efforts of the Santas Casas da Misericórdia during his reign and the reconstruction of the Hospital das Caldas da Rainha and the Hospital Real de Todos-os-Santos, which were mainly patronaged by his wife D. Leonor.

The image became linked to the medieval religious feast of Corpus Christi. The universities of Oxford and Cambridge each have colleges named for the religious festival nearest the dates of their establishment, and both Corpus Christi College, Cambridge, and Corpus Christi College, Oxford, feature pelicans on their coats of arms.

The medical faculties of Charles University in Prague also have a pelican as their emblem. The symbol of the Irish Blood Transfusion Service is a pelican, and for most of its existence the headquarters of the service was located at Pelican House in Dublin, Ireland. The heraldic pelican also ended up as a pub name and image, though sometimes with the image of the ship Golden Hind. Sir Francis Drake's famous ship was initially called Pelican, and adorned the British halfpenny coin.

Modern usage

The great white pelican is the national bird of Romania. The brown pelican is the national bird of three Caribbean countries—Saint Kitts and Nevis, Barbados, and Sint Maarten—and features on their coats of arms. It is also the state bird of the US state of Louisiana, which is known colloquially as the Pelican State; the bird appears on the state flag and state seal. It adorns the seals of Louisiana State University, Tulane University, Louisiana Tech University, the University of Louisiana at Lafayette, Loyola University New Orleans, Southeastern Louisiana University, and Southern University, and is the mascot of the New Orleans Pelicans NBA team, the Lahti Pelicans ice hockey team, Tulane University, and the University of the West Indies. A white pelican logo is used by the Portuguese bank Montepio Geral, and a pelican is depicted on the reverse of the Albanian 1 lek coin, issued in 1996. The name and image were used for Pelican Books, an imprint of nonfiction books published by Penguin Books. The seal of the Packer Collegiate Institute, a pelican feeding her young, has been in use since 1885.

The pelican is the subject of a popular limerick originally composed by Dixon Lanier Merritt in 1910 with several variations by other authors. The original version ran:

Notes

References

Cited texts

External links

Pelican videos on the Internet Bird Collection

Articles containing video clips
Extant Chattian first appearances
National symbols of Barbados

Pelecanus
Taxa named by Carl Linnaeus